Eyyvah Eyvah 2 is a 2011 Turkish comedy film, directed by Hakan Algül, starring Ata Demirer as a young clarinet player who struggles to win back his fiancé after she moves to a small village in the Turkish countryside.

Plot
Hüseyin (Ata Demirer), a clarinetist from a village in Turkey's Thracian region, tries to reach his fiancé, who works as a nurse in a village near Çanakkale, to give her a ring to win back her heart.

Release

Reception
The film was number 1 in the Turkish national box office for three weeks running and has made a total gross of US$15,363,346.

References

External links
  

2010s Turkish-language films
2011 comedy films
2011 films
Films set in Turkey
Turkish comedy films
Turkish sequel films